W239BT is a low-powered radio translator station that is licensed to Glasgow, Kentucky, and primarily serving the Caveland area and the Bowling Green, Kentucky vicinity. Owned by SOKY Radio, Inc., it broadcasts a Contemporary hit radio format at a frequency of 95.7 Megahertz, and it is known on air as "95.9 The Vibe". W239BT transmits from a tower located near Haywood, just southwest of Glasgow.

The translator-style radio station is simulcast over a HD2 subchannel, WOVO-HD2, that can be accessible via an HD Radio Tuner. This makes WOVO the second radio station in Bowling Green to multi-plex their HD Radio signal; sister station WPTQ was the first in the market to do so. As a Top 40 station, the translator's main rivals are WUHU in Bowling Green, and Nashville's WRVW.

History 
WOVO launched the station on a HD2 subchannel in 2015. Most radio users do not have an HD Radio set, so the subchannel has been simulcasting over two translators, W239BT of Glasgow, and W240CP in Bowling Green.

On March 21, 2018, W239BT/WOVO-HD2 rebranded as "95.9 The Vibe".

Signal coverage 
The station's translator signal mainly covers Barren, Allen, and nearby portions of neighboring counties. The signal can be picked up as far west as Bowling Green, as far north as Munfordville, as far east as Edmonton, and as far south as rural northern Macon County, Tennessee.

References

External links
WOVO-FM Official Website 

239BT
Contemporary hit radio stations in the United States
Radio stations established in 2015
2015 establishments in Kentucky
Glasgow, Kentucky